Essi Katriina Sainio (born 9 September 1986) is a Finnish footballer, who is currently plays for HJK in Finland. She played for SC Freiburg of Germany's Frauen-Bundesliga before having a few years break due personal reasons . She previously played for Turbine Potsdam in Germany and for AIK of the Swedish Damallsvenskan. Sainio began her senior career with Naisten Liiga clubs FC Honka and HJK in her home country. Since making her debut in 2006, Sainio won 45 caps and scored three goals for the Finland women's national football team. A winger who can also play as a full-back, she was part of the Finnish team which hosted UEFA Women's Euro 2009 and reached the quarter-finals.

Club career

Her career began at the age of nine years at FC Kasiysi Espoo. She then moved to FC Espoo and FC Honka Espoo and arrived at HJK Helsinki in 2005.

Her transfer from the German Frauen-Bundesliga team 1. FFC Turbine Potsdam to the Swedish Damallsvenskan club AIK was announced in May 2009. At AIK Sainio made seven appearances and scored one goal before suffering an anterior cruciate ligament injury in 2010. She was allowed to move back to Germany with SC Freiburg in July 2010.

International career

Sainio made her debut in the Finnish national team on 5 June 2006 against Belgium. A few weeks later she signed a three-year deal with the then German champion 1. FFC Turbine Potsdam. During the 2006 FIFA U-20 Women's World Championship in Russia, she suffered a fracture of her middle foot. She then suffered the same fracture in March 2007 at the Algarve Cup and again in July 2007 at the Nordic Cup.

National coach Michael Käld selected Sainio in the squad for UEFA Women's Euro 2009, which Finland were hosting. She started the 3–2 quarter-final defeat by England, but was substituted for Annica Sjölund early in the second half.

References

External links

 
 
 Player German domestic football stats  at DFB
 
 Official homepage of 1. FFC Turbine Potsdam
 Interview by Fansoccer.de (in German)

1986 births
Living people
Finnish women's footballers
Finnish expatriate footballers
Finland women's international footballers
1. FFC Turbine Potsdam players
SC Freiburg (women) players
Footballers from Helsinki
Expatriate women's footballers in Sweden
Expatriate women's footballers in Germany
AIK Fotboll (women) players
Damallsvenskan players
Helsingin Jalkapalloklubi (women) players
FC Honka (women) players
Kansallinen Liiga players
Women's association football midfielders
UEFA Women's Euro 2022 players